Eyewitness (released as Sudden Terror in the United States) is a 1970 British thriller film directed by John Hough, and starring Mark Lester, Susan George, and Lionel Jeffries. Its plot follows a young English boy who, while staying with his grandfather and adult sister in Malta, witnesses a political assassination, and is subsequently pursued by the killers—however, due to his habitual lying, those around him are hesitant to believe his claims. It is an adaptation of the novel by Mark Hebden, the pen name for John Harris, and bears similarity to Cornell Woolrich's novelette "The Boy Cried Murder", originally adapted for film as The Window.

Plot 
Ziggy, an English boy of about twelve, is spending the summer in Malta with his adult sister, Pippa, at their grandfather's lighthouse. He is indulged by his grandfather to live in a fantasy world of his own imagination, and to be a social rule-breaker (i.e. banging the drum of the military drummer as he walks through the street).

In town with Pippa, they join the crowds to watch a military reception for a visiting African dignitary. In the parade, the open-top car is fired upon from above and the occupants killed. Ziggy, having slipped away from his sister to look for a better viewpoint, sees that the shots were fired by someone in a policeman's uniform from a window next to him, but he is seen by the shooter and his accomplice who search for Ziggy and pursue him on their motorcycles, but he uses his knowledge of the area to escape. Pippa is picked up by a man in the crowd, Tom Jones, and Ziggy manages to find them in her car on the edge of town.

Pippa doesn't believe his story and chastises what she sees as his wicked lying. Ziggy then tells them his pursuers are in a car following them and panics them into driving to escape it and almost crashing, but it turns out he was wrong, reinforcing Pippa's conviction that he is lying. The chief of police declares martial law and a general curfew, so Tom has to stay at Ziggy and Pippa's home overnight.

At first, Ziggy's grandpa, a retired colonel, treats Tom somewhat offhandedly, and the housekeeper, something of a martinet, does not like having Tom around. However, as the evening progresses and he discovers more of Ziggy's story, the grandpa starts to think that Ziggy is telling the truth. The police arrive at the lighthouse to check who is staying there. Ziggy panics and runs off. Granpa phones the police to report him missing.

Ziggy runs to town and hides in the garden of a young female friend who herself goes missing and is picked up by police. The police accidentally release her into the care of the renegade policemen and when they return to her house they kill her and her father, and Ziggy runs off again. He goes to a church where the priest shields him from the killers at the cost of his own life. The killers then chase Ziggy into the catacombs under the church.

At Police HQ, they realise two people are pretending to be policeman. The chief of police compares the problem to G. K. Chesterton's story of the postman murderer, "The Invisible Man". He deduces that no-one notices the fake policemen.

Back at the lighthouse, Granpa is sure Ziggy will return, as "bad pennies always turn up". Next to die is his housekeeper, with a police jeep seen driving off.

Granpa goes to town and finds Ziggy hiding in the darkness under a table in his friend's house. Granpa now believes his story. Pippa and Tom appear, but the fake policemen start shooting at the house. Granpa and Tom make Molotov cocktails using paraffin lamps filled with brandy. Granpa keeps the villains at bay while the others escape. One villain goes to confront Granpa and a car chase starts with the assassin policeman chasing Tom, Pippa, and Ziggy. He tries to ram them off the road and topples the car onto its side, and then pushes it gradually towards a cliff edge. Just in time, Granpa, arriving with the Chief of Police, shoots the assassin with an old service rifle, and the assassin's car drives over the cliff.

Cast

Production 
The film is based on a 1966 novel by Mark Hebden, which was set in France and concerned an assassination attempt on the French president. The New York Times called it "simple and predictable... but a good deal of charm and spirit in the storyline". The Spectator called it "a colourful, busy and suspenseful affair".

It was a co-production between EMI Films, then under Bryan Forbes, and ITC Entertainment.

John Hough, who had made the film Wolfshead: The Legend of Robin Hood, learned that Bryan Forbes had taken over EMI Films and was interested in young filmmakers. He called Forbes and showed him his film at Forbes's office in Elstree. (This was filmed by a BBC documentary on Forbes called Man Alive.) Forbes had a script called Eyewitness, have given the project to Irving Allen to make and Paul Maslansky to produce. Hough was assigned a direct. Forbes did some uncredited rewriting of the script.

Locations
The film was shot entirely in Malta (mainly Valletta), although in the movie the name of the nation is not given, and the flag (a modified cross with red and white colours) and coat of arms shown are different from Malta's.

The lighthouse is Delimara Lighthouse.

Jonathan Demme was working as a rock journalist in London during filming and was hired by Irving Allen to be a musical co-ordinator on the film.

Music
The film includes music by Fairfield Parlour and additional music by Van der Graaf Generator.

Release 
Eyewitness opened in London on 10 September 1970. In December 1970, National General agreed to distribute the film in the United States.

Critical response 
The New York Times called the film an "exasperating model of how not to film the fable of the boy who cried wolf... What ever happened to British restraint? The tone of the film is even more hysterical than the boy... Under John Hough's direction, the picture raucously careens after the sprinting lad, with the nervous color camera all but doing a back flip, plus a blaring score of eerie sounds and spookier rock 'n' roll. Worst of all, the screenplay continually cuts from the boy and his plight to some singularly dull adults."

The Los Angeles Times called it "thoroughly satisfying".

Box office 
According to EMI Records, the film performed "outstandingly" in Japan. However, it was a box-office disappointment.

Adaptations 
The film is the third of four versions of the story. The others are:
 The Window (1949)
 The Boy Cried Murder (1966)
 Cloak & Dagger (1984)

References

External links 
 
 

1970 films
1970s thriller drama films
British thriller drama films
Films directed by John Hough
Films set in Malta
EMI Films films
Films with screenplays by Ronald Harwood
1970 drama films
Films produced by Paul Maslansky
Films about witness protection
1970s English-language films
1970s British films